Princess Seonhwa, which according to the Samguk Yusa, was a Silla Royal Princess as the third daughter of King Jinpyeong and Lady Maya, younger sister to Princess Deokman and Princess Cheonmyeong. She was also the queen consort of Baekje since 600 CE as the wife of King Mu.

However, her existence is controversial due to the discovery of evidence that points to King Uija's mother as being Queen Sataek and not Seonhwa as indicated by historical records. There is also a theory said that Seonhwa married to King Dongseong, not King Mu, which made various hypotheses about her status, such as the princess of Baekje, a noblewoman (귀족), even a daughter of a local noble (호족) instead of Silla's princess.

Biography
The Prince of Baekje, Seodong who loved her went to Gyeongju, the capital city of Shilla and he taught and made the children in there to sing a nursery rhyme which made by himself while provided Korean yams for them in reward for good performance of it. The children's song is called Seo Dong Yo (서동요, 薯童謠), which tells a secret love story of a Princess Seonhwa sneaking out to get together with Seodong every night. Soon, hearing the news of all the children in the whole city going around singing the song, the King Jinpyeong goes through the roof and expels the Princess Seonhwa out of Gyeongju.

On her way to a place of exile, the Princess Seonhwa met Seodong and fell in love with him, ending up go over to Baekje to live with him. Later, Seodong became the King Mu of Baekje, and Princess Seonhwa his wife. The Princess Seonhwa asked the King Mu to build  Mireuksa in Iksan, North Jeolla Province. And she and the King Mu had a son who was destined to be the last King of Baekje Dynasty, Uija of Baekje.

In popular culture
 Portrayed by Choi Sulli and Lee Bo-young in the 2005–2006 SBS TV series Ballad of Seodong.
 Portrayed by Shin Eun-jung in the 2011 MBC TV series Gyebaek.

See also
Mireuksa
Seodong-yo

Royal consorts of Baekje
Princesses of Silla
Queen Seondeok of Silla
7th-century women
7th-century Korean women